Justice Higgins may refer to:

Andrew Jackson Higgins (judge) (1921–2011), chief justice of the Supreme Court of Missouri
Archibald T. Higgins (1894–1945), associate justice of the Louisiana Supreme Court
Carlisle W. Higgins (1889–1980), associate justice of the North Carolina Supreme Court
H. B. Higgins (1851–1929), justice of the High Court of Australia